The Baseball-Bundesliga is the professional elite competition for the sport of baseball in Germany.  In it, the men's German championship is determined annually.  Like most European sports leagues, the Bundesliga uses a system of promotion and relegation.  The highest division of the Bundesliga currently consists of sixteen teams in two divisions, with each team playing four games against each other team.  The league is regulated by the German Baseball and Softball Association (DBV).

Season format
After a 28-game regular season (8 teams per division), the first four teams in the North and the South make the playoff quarterfinals. The team with the best record in the regular season plays the fourth-best team of the opposite division, and the 2nd-place team plays the 3rd-place team of the opposite division. All playoff series follow a 2–3 format, where the lower seeded team hosts the first two games, except the finals, which follow a 2–2–1 format.

The teams finishing 5th through 8th play a reverse playoff within their own division to determine one or two teams to be relegated. The winners of the first round stay up, while the losers play each other in another series. The losing team of the second round is automatically relegated, while the winner plays a 3-game playoff against the 2nd-place team of Division 2. In case there are only 7 teams in the division, the 5th through 7th teams will play a round-robin series with four games against each other where the last-place team will go to the playoff against the 2nd-place team of Division 2.

History
A precursor to the baseball-bundesliga was founded between 1951, with the Stuttgart Phillies winning the inaugural national championship. However, the league disbanded following the 1970 season, leaving Germany without a national league for 11 years.

The baseball-bundesliga, in its current incarnation, was established in 1982. Two teams produced dynasties during the league's first two decades of operation: the Mannheim Tornados won every championship from 1984 to 1989, and the Paderborn Untouchables won every championship from 2001 to 2005. The league claims that in 1990, there were 2000 baseball players in Germany, while that number has grown to exceed 30,000 today.

In 2010, the league promoted the Dohren Wild Farmers and the Neuenburg Atomics. At the end of the season, the Neuenburg Atomics were relegated with the worst record in the Southern Division (1–27).  The Saarlouis Hornets voluntarily relegated themselves for financial reasons, despite posting the best record (19–21) in a ten-year history in the first division, causing the Southern Division to contract from eight to seven teams. The two teams were replaced by the Bad Homburg Hornets. In the Northern Division, the Cologne Cardinals were relegated at the end the season and replaced by the champions of the second division, the Berlin Sluggers.

A motion to reduce the league from 16 to 12 teams was denied by a Competition Commission established by the DBV prior to a general meeting of all the baseball clubs in Germany in Frankfurt am Main on 13 November 2010.  At the meeting itself, it was agreed to add an All Star Game for the 2012 season.

Champions
See:

Division I and Division II teams

2020 Teams, Division I

See also

References

External links
German Baseball and Softball Association official website (German)
Buchbinder Legionäre Internet Live
Haar Disciples Internet Live

Baseball competitions in Germany
Germany
Base
Sports leagues established in 1984
1984 establishments in Germany
Professional sports leagues in Germany